This is a list of commercial banks in Uruguay.

State-owned 
 Banco de la República Oriental del Uruguay
 Banco Hipotecario del Uruguay
 Banco Central del Uruguay

Private 
 Banco Bandes Uruguay S.A.
 Banco Itaú Uruguay  S.A.
 Scotiabank Uruguay S.A. (ex. Nuevo Banco Comercial S.A.)
 Banco Santander S.A.
 Banco Bilbao Vizcaya Argentaria Uruguay S.A.
 HSBC Bank (Uruguay) S.A.
 Citibank N.A. Sucursal Uruguay
 Banco de la Nación Argentina
 Banque Heritage Uruguay

Closed 
 Banco Maua
 Banco Popular de Montevideo 
 Banco La Caja Obrera 
 Banco Montevideo 
 Banco de Crédito 
 Banco Comercial 
 Banco Transatlántico 
 Banco de Londres y Río de la Plata 
 Banco Pan de Azúcar 
 Banco Territorial

Mergers and acquisitions

See also
 List of banks in the Americas

References

External links
Website of the Central Bank of Uruguay

 
Banks
Uruguay
Uruguay